Austrodytes is a genus of beetles in the family Dytiscidae found only in northern Australia. The genus contains these two species:

 Austrodytes insularis (Hope, 1841)
 Austrodytes plateni Hendrich, 2003

References

Dytiscidae